Tommy Overstreet was an American country music artist. His discography consists of 17 studio albums, three compilation albums, one live albums, and 40 singles. 34 of his singles charted on the Billboard Hot Country Songs chart between 1969 and 1986.

Albums

Studio albums

Compilation albums

Live albums

Singles

References

Country music discographies
 
Discographies of American artists